Gone Missing is a 2013 American television film.

Synopsis
Rene's daughter, Kaitlin, and her best friend, Maddy, disappeared from a resort in San Diego during spring break. Dissatisfied with the responses of the authorities, Rene, with the help of her son, Kennedy, and Maddy's mother, Lisa, investigates the case and discovers some disturbing facts about the secret life of one of her missing daughter.

Cast
 Daphne Zuniga as Rene
 Lauren Bowles as Lisa
 Brigette Davidovici as Kaitlin
 Gage Golightly as Maddy
 Nicholas R. Grava as Kennedy
 James Martin Kelly as Officer Benton
 Alejandro Patiño as Martin Guzman
 Brock Harris as Alex
 Hunter Garner as Dylan
 David Stifel as Willie

Production
Gone Missing is one of the first films by Marvista which was produced with cloud storage: the video captured during production was sent directly to a cloud rather than a physical memory as is traditionally done in the current movies.

Release
The film was first released on Lifetime on June 13, 2013. The world premiere took place on June 15, 2013. It was released on Blu-ray in UK.

Review
Dorothy Rabinowitz reviewing the film for The Wall Street Journal wrote:

Jill O'Rourke for Crushable wrote:

References

External links
 

2013 television films
2013 films
2010s adventure films
2013 thriller drama films
American adventure films
American thriller drama films
Films set in San Diego
American drama television films
2010s American films